Brian Rowsom (born October 23, 1965) is an American basketball coach and former player, who was selected by the Indiana Pacers in the second round (34th pick overall) of the 1987 NBA draft. 

A 6' 10" power forward from the University of North Carolina at Wilmington, Rowsom played in 3 NBA seasons from 1987 to 1990. He played for the Pacers and Charlotte Hornets. In his NBA career, Rowsom played in 82 games and scored a total of 457 points. 

After his NBA career, Rowsom played in Israel for Hapoel Eilat (1991/92–1994/95)

Post-retirement, Rowsom became a basketball coach. He coached the Toshiba Brave Thunders of the Japanese NBL. He was the head coach for the Hochiminh City Wings. On July 20, 2018, he was changed to team counselor.

Head coaching record

|-
| style="text-align:left;"|Oita Heat Devils
| style="text-align:left;"|2009-10
| 52||25||27|||| style="text-align:center;"|5th in Western|||-||-||-||
| style="text-align:center;"|-
|-
| style="text-align:left;"|Hochiminh City Wings
| style="text-align:left;"|2018
| 15||1||14|||| style="text-align:center;"|6th|||-||-||-||
| style="text-align:center;"|-
|-
| style="text-align:left;"|San-en NeoPhoenix
| style="text-align:left;"|2019-20
| 10||0||10|||| style="text-align:center;"|Fired|||-||-||-||
| style="text-align:center;"|-
|-

References

External links

1965 births
Living people
American expatriate basketball people in Israel
American expatriate basketball people in Japan
American expatriate basketball people in Qatar
American expatriate basketball people in the United Kingdom
American men's basketball players
Basketball coaches from New Jersey
Basketball players from Newark, New Jersey
Charlotte Hornets players
Ehime Orange Vikings coaches
Élan Béarnais players
Hapoel Eilat basketball players
Indiana Pacers draft picks
Indiana Pacers players
Israeli Basketball Premier League players
Kawasaki Brave Thunders players
Power forwards (basketball)
San-en NeoPhoenix coaches
Toshiba Kawasaki Brave Thunders coaches
UNC Wilmington Seahawks men's basketball players